This is a list of notable Kenyan writers and artists.

Architects 

 Emma Miloyo (born 1981) - partner in Design Source in Nairobi; first woman to chair the Architectural Association of Kenya (AAK) Architects' Chapter

Artists / Photographers

 Barbara Minishi
 Jim Chuchu (born 1982)
 Waweru (born 1951)
 Kawira Mwirichia (born 1986)
 Christopher Oywecha
 Osborne Macharia (born 1986)
 Boniface Mwangi (born 1983)
 Mohamed Amin (born 1943)
 Miriam Syowia Kyambi (born 1979)

Authors

Eastlandah David (Wesonga) (born 1985)
Mugo Gatheru (born 1925)
John Rugoiyo Gichuki
Elspeth Huxley (1907–1997)
Daniel Kamau
Josiah Mwangi Kariuki (1929–1975)
Jomo Kenyatta (1893–1978)
Maina wa Kinyatti
John Mbiti (1931–2019)
Micere Githae Mugo (born 1942)
Wahome Mutahi (1954–2003)
Meja Mwangi (born 1948)
Gitura Mwaura
Ngugi wa Mirii (1951–2008)
Michael Ndurumo (born 1952)
Mũkoma wa Ngũgĩ (born 1971)
Chacha Nyaigotti-Chacha (born 1952)
Atieno Odhiambo (1945–2009)
Bethwell Allan Ogot (born 1929)
Grace Ogot (1930–2015) - short story writer, novelist
Ngũgĩ wa Thiong'o (born 1938) - novelist, playwright, essayist
Binyavanga Wainaina (1971–2019)
Koigi wa Wamwere (born 1949)
Kingwa Kamencu - poet, script writer

Musicians

Akothee (born 1980) - singer and dancer
Jua Cali (born 1979) - genge rapper, singer/composer
King Kaka (born 1987) - rapper/songwriter/businessman
Harry Kimani (born 1982) - singer/songwriter
Mighty King Kong (1973–2007) - singer/songwriter
Monski (born 1994) - rapper/songwriter
Stella Mwangi (born 1986) - rapper/songwriter
Nonini (born 1982) - singer/songwriter
Obinna - singer/songwriter
Wangechi (born 1994) - singer/songwriter

Performing artists

Sarah Hassan (born 1988)
Njeri Luseno
Henrie Mutuku (born 1978)
Lizz Njagah

References

Kenyan
 List of Kenyan artists
Artists